Thomas Price was twice President of the British Virgin Islands, Acting President from 1857 to 1858, and then President from 1859 to 1861, and then Lieutenant-Governor of Dominica from 1861 to 1864. In 1862, Price dissolved the Dominican legislature and called a new election over a controversy from a bill pressing for a proper registration of voters' qualifications.

He was the son of Sir Rose Price, 1st Baronet of Trengwainton, Cornwall.

He had a wife, Anna, who died on the Island of Tortola in 1857, at the age of 39.

References

Presidents of the British Virgin Islands
British Dominica people
Governors of Dominica

19th-century British people
Year of birth missing
Year of death missing